Guthrie Corridor Expressway, GCE,  (Malay: Lebuhraya Koridor Guthrie) is an expressway in Klang Valley, Selangor, Malaysia. It connects Shah Alam to Rawang. The expressway is unique in Malaysia in that all project costs, including land acquisition, were completely borne by the concessionaire. Of the land acquired, 80 percent was from a plantation company Guthrie Berhad which in 2007 merged with two other companies to form Sime Darby. Today this expressway is owned by Prolintas and its subsidiary Prolintas Expressway Sdn Bhd.
The starting point of the highway or 'Kilometre Zero' is located at the Jalan Monfort intersection near Shah Alam.

History
The proposal to develop GCE began in 2002 when Guthrie Berhad became a major shareholder of this project apart from owning other businesses such as large plantations and property development projects. Construction started in 2003. GCE was built along an oil palm estate owned by Guthrie Berhad and was completed in April 2005. It commenced operations in July 2005.

In August 2007, GCE became a subsidiary of Prolintas Expressway Sdn Bhd (PEX).

Features

Smooth access from Shah Alam to northern states without being trapped in common traffic jams in the New Klang Valley Expressway (NKVE).
Many oil palm estates with property development potential along this expressway.
Motorcycle lane, including a southbound flyover which passes above the Denai Alam exit, built as part of the DASH Highway construction project.
SOS emergency.
Competitive toll rate.
Speed limits are 90 km/h–110 km/h
Several rest areas (R&R) near toll plazas with free Wi-Fi
Malaysian Road Transport Department (JPJ) Enforcement Stations

Tolls
GCE adopts an open toll system.

Electronic Toll Collections (ETC)
As part of an initiative to facilitate faster transactions at the Bukit Jelutong, Elmina and Lagong Toll Plazas, all toll transactions at these three toll plazas on GCE are conducted electronically via Touch 'n Go cards or SmartTAGs beginning 2 March 2016.

Toll rates
There are three toll plazas along GCE, each charging the same rate. In October 2022, it was one of the four expressways maintained by PROLINTAS to have its toll rates deducted between 8% to 15%.

(Starting 20 October 2022)

List of interchanges and rest and service areas

Below is a list of interchanges (exits), laybys and rest and service areas along GCE. The exits are arranged in ascending numerical order from North to South.

Gallery

References

External links
Prolintas website
Guthrie Corridor Expressway

2005 establishments in Malaysia
Prolintas Expressway Networks
Expressways in Malaysia
Expressways and highways in the Klang Valley